Sembla, or Seenku, is a Western Mande language within the Samogo group of Burkina Faso. The northern and southern dialects, Timiku and Gbeneku, are easily intelligible.

The language is also known as Samogho and "Southern Samo", which is also the name of one of the Samo languages.

Further reading

References

Samogo languages
Languages of Burkina Faso